Marudhu is a 2016 Indian Tamil-language action drama film written and directed by M. Muthaiah. It features Vishal in the lead role. Production began in November 2015. It was released worldwide on 20 May 2016 with mixed reviews but ended up as a profitable venture at the box office.

Plot
Maruthu is a laborer from Rajapalayam who does not tolerate injustice, and leads a happy life with his grandmother Appathaa, and his close friend Kokkarako. One day, Maruthu encounters Bhagyalakshmi "Bhagyam", a bold young woman, at a temple, but their first meeting goes badly due to a misunderstanding, and he ends up at a police station. With Appathaa's help, Maruthu soon manages to win Bhagyam's heart. One day, Maruthu sees some goons chasing Bhagyam and her father near the market where he is working. Maruthu beats up the goons and then learns from Bhagyam's father why the goons are after them. Bhagyam was the daughter of Mariyamma, a brave woman who stood up to the atrocities committed by the municipal chairman Rolex Pandiyan on the local people. When she decided to run against Pandiyan in the upcoming municipal election, Pandiyan and his men brutally hack her to death and stuff all her parts except her head into a bag. 

Bhagyam and her father are unable to prove in court that Pandiyan committed the murder since there is no head, and that the Inspector is Pandiyan's henchman. They are also threatened of dire consequences by Pandiyan if they continue to target him. Appathaa, who witnessed Mariyamma's brutal murder and is upset that she didn't stop it, gets Maruthu married to Bhagyam to repent her earlier actions, and Maruthu also promises to avenge Mariyamma's death. A cat-and-mouse game soon begins between Maruthu and Pandiyan, with Pandiyan using all means to stop Bhagyam and Appathaa from testifying against him, but to no avail. At the court, Appathaa testifies against Pandiyan, who is issued an arrest warrant against him. In retribution, Pandiyan kidnaps Appathaa and brutally tortures her to death. Enraged, Maruthu single-handedly fights Pandiyan and his gang and kills them all.

Cast

Vishal as Maruthu
Soori as Kokkarako
Kulappulli Leela as Mariyamma (Appatha)
Sri Divya as Bhagyalakshmi (Bhagyam)
R. K. Suresh as Rolex Pandiyan
Radha Ravi as Bailwan
Aadhira Pandilakshmi as Shambhavi (Mariyamma), Bhagyam's mother
G. Marimuthu as Bhagyam's father
G. Gnanasambandam as Tahsildar
Namo Narayana as Pambarathaan
Aruldoss as Rolex Pandiyan’s henchmen 
Bharathi Kannan
Saravana Sakthi

Production
Vishal agreed terms to feature in an action film directed by Muthaiah and produced by Anbuchezhiyan during July 2015, with D. Imman and Velraj added to the team as music composer and cinematographer, respectively. Lakshmi Menon was considered to play the film's lead actress, but the role was eventually handed to Sri Divya. R. K. Suresh was picked to play an antagonist, while Radharavi was also added to the cast of the film, much surprisingly, after losing to Vishal in a much-publicized poll during the 2015 Nadigar Sangam elections.

The film began shooting in Rajapalayam in late November 2015, after a small launch ceremony.

Release
The satellite rights of the film were sold to Sun TV.

Soundtrack

The soundtrack of the film was composed by D. Imman.

Reception
The film received positive reviews from critics. Behindwoods called it "One more rural flick riding high on and violence".

References

External links
 

2010s Tamil-language films
2016 action drama films
2010s masala films
Films scored by D. Imman
Indian action drama films
Films directed by M. Muthaiah